Sphodromantis gastrica, with the common names African mantis or common green mantis, is a species of praying mantis from Africa.

It averages  in body length, and has a very diverse diet, hunting any prey of reasonable size.

Previously classified as Hierodula bicarinata  (Saussure, 1869) and as Sphodromantis guttata  (Giglio-Tos, 1907), this species has been found in South Africa, Namibia, Botswana, Zimbabwe, Zambia, Democratic Republic of Congo, and East Africa.

See also
African mantis
List of mantis genera and species

References

G
Mantodea of Africa
Insects of the Democratic Republic of the Congo
Insects of Namibia
Insects of South Africa
Insects of Uganda
Insects of Zambia
Insects of Zimbabwe
Insects described in 1858